Western Maryland Scenic Railroad No. 734, also known as Mountain Thunder, is a preserved class "SC-1" 2-8-0 "Consolidation" type steam locomotive originally built by the Baldwin Locomotive Works in 1916 for the Lake Superior and Ishpeming Railroad. The locomotive was built for service as a dock switcher and was originally LS&I No. 18. In 1923, the LS&I purchased the Munising, Marquette & Southeastern Railroad and the engine was renumbered to No. 34. It served the LS&I until it was retired from revenue service in 1961. In 1963, it was sold to the Marquette and Huron Mountain Railroad, but never operated under the M&HR flag. In 1971, the locomotive was sold to the Illinois Railway Museum for static display. Since 1991, No. 734 has been owned by the Western Maryland Scenic Railroad in Cumberland, Maryland, though it has not operated since April 2016. It is currently awaiting evaluation for potential overhaul.

History

Revenue service 
When World War I broke out, the Lake Superior and Ishpeming Railroad (LS&I) decided to get locomotives larger and more powerful than their B-4 class to pull passenger and iron ore trains between West Ishpeming and Marquette, Michigan, and the ore industry continued to rise. And so, they went to the drawing board to create a new type of steam locomotive with an 88'' diameter boiler, cylinder dimensions of 26'' x 30'', an engine weight of 270,000 pounds and a tractive effort of 55,900 pounds.

The railroad ordered these newly designed locomotives from Baldwin Locomotive Works of Philadelphia, Pennsylvania, and they were numbered 18-20, and one more was purchased by the Munising, Marquette and Southeastern Railway, (MM&SE) bringing the total number of these giants to four. Since both the sand domes and steam domes were squashed flat, and their bells were mounted on the sides of their boilers, they were earned the name "hogs", an epithet which they still hold. While the older B-4 class locomotives could pull 45 loaded hoppers on a 1.6% grade, the hogs could pull up to 60 loaded hoppers up on that same grade without any problems. 

In 1923, the LS&I received some additional 2-8-0s after purchasing the MM&SE, including that road's one hog, so a renumbering system and reclassification system were in order, and the hogs were reclassified as SC-1s, while being renumbered 30-33. No. 18 was renumbered 30, and the number 18 was given to an SC-4 class locomotive. Two years later, the LS&I purchased two former Chicago River and Indiana 2-8-0s 1 and 2 from the General Equipment Company, and while they were renumbered 30 and 31, Nos 30 and 31 became 34 and 35. Until the arrival of the LS&I's 2-10-2 "Santa Fe" types in 1930, the SC-1s remained as the backbone of the LS&I's mainline ore services. The hogs continued to pull heavy car loads of iron ore and passenger trains on the Michigan short line, but they were infrequently used during the winter. No. 34 was in charge of the pinch-hitting for diesel locomotives, especially when its classmates are under repair. This career for the locomotives ended, when the LS&I decided to fully dieselize in the early 1960s. No. 34 was retired in 1961, and it was stored near Marquette. The LS&I ended all steam operations the following year.

Early preservation 
In 1963, the railroad sold eleven of their 2-8-0s, as well as some of their passenger cars, to the Marquette and Huron Mountain Tourist Railroad. There are no known records of the 34 pulling any trains for that railroad. Only three of the SC-4s, Numbers 19, 22, and 23, were known to pull tourist trains there between Marquette and Big Bay. Instead, No. 34 sat with the rest of its sisters in the form of a scrapline, until 1971.  That year, No. 34 was sold to the Illinois Railway Museum in Union, Illinois, where it was cosmetically restored, and it remained on static display for the next twenty years.

Western Maryland Scenic Railroad 
The Western Maryland (WM) was a railroad that served a small town of Cumberland, Maryland along with a branch line that ran between there, Frostburg, and other small towns. After the branch line was abandoned by the Chessie System, a joint effort was formed between the city of Cumberland, Allegany County, and the newly formed Scenic Railroad Development Corporation (SRDC) to restore the branch into a possible tourist attraction. As part of the deal, the SRDC was given the old WM shops in Ridgeley, West Virginia, a 1913 station building in Cumberland, and an 1891 Cumberland and Pennsylvania wooden depot in Frostburg. 

After this acquisition was completed, the SRDC leased the newly-restored trackage to Jack Showalter's Allegany Central Railroad, which used Canadian Pacific 4-6-2 "Pacific" type locomotives Numbers 1238 and 1286 to pull the excursion trains. After the Allegany Central was moved to Staunton, Virginia, the SRDC’s name was changed to the Western Maryland Scenic Railroad (WMSR), and they began searching for their own steam locomotive to restore. The steam locomotive they acquired was No. 34, which was removed from the Illinois Railway Museum's property in 1991. Later that year, restoration work began while multiple modifications were given, including a centered headlight and a larger tender from New York Central (NYC) 4-8-2 “Mohawk” No. 2662, and the locomotive was renumbered to 734. The modifications were intended to make the locomotive represent the Western Maryland's own series of 2-8-0s, none of which survived the scrapper's torch. Although this is now numbered after an original H-7a No. 734, the locomotive also now has an appearance of an H-9. Additionally, in 1998, No. 734's new tender was given a mechanical stoker.

Restoration work was completed in 1993, and No. 734 was ready to start its new career as a tourist steam locomotive. In September 2013, the scenic railroad was visited by 0-4-0 tank engines Viscose Co 6 and Flagg Coal Co 75, and they operated alongside No. 734 and stayed for a night photo session for the 25th anniversary of the grand re-opening of the tourist line. The following month, No. 734 was temporarily renumbered 729 to pay tribute to another long lost WM 2-8-0, and this was for a photo session of the locomotive pushing and pulling freight.

In 2014, the WM Scenic Railroad announced that they would purchase Chesapeake and Ohio (C&O) 2-6-6-2 "Mallet" No. 1309 from the B&O Railroad Museum in Baltimore, Maryland and operational restoration work for the locomotive began. Over time operations changed and grew, and No. 734 was often being pushed far beyond her normal operating capabilities, resulting in extreme wear and tear, or ran with a diesel helper which increased operating cost, so a larger engine was needed. In 2015, the Scenic Railroad announced that No. 734 was going to be pulled from excursion service for display, as it was getting close to being due for a mandated 1,472-day boiler inspection required by the Federal Railroad Administration (FRA). It made its last passenger run on September 26, 2015, and after hauling one last photo freight train on April 9, 2016, roughly the locomotive's 100th birthday, Mountain Thunder was silenced.

Since 2016, the locomotive sat in storage outside the WMSR's Ridgeley shops. The WMSR has revealed that the locomotive is in poor mechanical condition, and it needs to go through a complete overhaul. While very powerful, No. 734 is much too small to handle the longer trains of the Summer and Autumn seasons, so No. 734's role would primarily be as power for off-season steam runs and stand-by power for No. 1309 in the busier season. More news about No. 734 was announced on April 19, 2021, the locomotive's 105th birthday, stating that after the railroad was misquoted by the Cumberland Times-News, it was revealed that the trackage is currently at FRA Class 1 standards, and operations begin as soon as No. 1309 was ready, though beforehand, they completed a tie-replacement program to bring the railroad back in line with FRA Class 2 standards, which will allow operation of passenger trains at up to 30 miles per hour. For the time being, Mountain Thunder would go through brief cosmetic restoration to improve its overall appearance as a static display. In March 2022, Western Maryland Scenic announced that they will be taking donations for an evaluation on the 734, possibly allowing the locomotive to return to service in the near future.

Original locomotive 
The original Western Maryland No. 734 was an H-7a class 2-8-0. It was built by the American Locomotive Company's former Richmond Locomotive Works of Richmond, Virginia in 1911 for freight service on the WM's mainline, but as larger locomotives were built, it was downgraded as a branch line locomotive, and as a helper locomotive by pushing heavy trains up steep grades. No. 734 was different than the current LS&I 34, by having a switcher-style cowcatcher, a high-mounted headlight, a more rounded cab, a smaller four-axle tender with a lower fuel and water capacity, it had older-style cylinders that were 25 x 30 inches(635 x 762 millimeters), it was over 27,000 pounds lighter than 34, it had a driving wheel diameter of 60 inches, and used Walschaerts valve gear, instead of Baker valve gear. It's parts were also meant to be interchangeable with other WM locomotives, including the K-2 class 4-6-2s. The locomotive was removed from service by 1954, and it was subsequently sold for scrap.

Gallery

See also 

 Grand Canyon Railway 29
Lake Superior and Ishpeming 33
 Chesapeake and Ohio 1309

Further reading
 
 Unknown Author(1916). Railway and Locomotive Engineering; A Practical Journal of Motive Power, Rolling Stock and Appliances: Volume 29. Classic Reprint Series

References

External links 
 No. 734 - Western Maryland Scenic Railroad

2-8-0 locomotives
Railway locomotives introduced in 1916
Standard gauge steam locomotives
Standard gauge locomotives of the United States
Individual locomotives of the United States
Freight locomotives
Lake Superior and Ishpeming locomotives
Baldwin locomotives
Preserved steam locomotives of Maryland